Guillermo Cañas defeated Andy Roddick in the final, 6–4, 7–5 to win the men's singles tennis title at the 2002 Canada Masters.

Andrei Pavel was the defending champion, but lost in the second round to Marat Safin.

Seeds
A champion seed is indicated in bold text while text in italics indicates the round in which that seed was eliminated.

  Lleyton Hewitt (first round)
  Marat Safin (quarterfinals)
  Tommy Haas (semifinals)
  Tim Henman (third round)
  Yevgeny Kafelnikov (third round)
  Albert Costa (first round)
  Andre Agassi (withdrew due to a hip strain)
  Juan Carlos Ferrero (second round)
  Thomas Johansson (second round)
  Roger Federer (first round)
  Sébastien Grosjean (quarterfinals)
  Andy Roddick (final)
  Pete Sampras (third round)
  Jiří Novák (semifinals)
  David Nalbandian (quarterfinals)
  Carlos Moyá (second round)

Draw

Finals

Top half

Section 1

Section 2

Bottom half

Section 3

Section 4

External links
 2002 Canada Masters Draw

2002 Canada Masters and the Rogers AT&T Cup
Singles